Eleanor "Ellie" Robinson  (born 30 August 2001) is an English swimmer. Competing in SB6 and S6 classification events, Robinson holds the World record and the Paralympic record in the S6 50m butterfly and the World record in the 100m, setting both at the age of 13.

In 2016, Robinson won four medals at the 2016 IPC Swimming European Championships. She followed this success at the Rio Paralympics in 2016, where she won the gold medal in the women's S6 50m butterfly event and bronze in the women's S6 100m freestyle event. She became known for her "gangsta swagger" as she entered the pool in her oversized coat with its hood up.

On 14 December 2016, it was announced that she had won the BBC Young Sports Personality of the Year.

Robinson was recognised in the 2017 New Year Honours, being appointed Member of the Most Excellent Order of the British Empire (MBE) for services to swimming.

Personal life
Robinson was born in 2001 with rare type of dwarfism cartilage hair hypoplasia and lives in Northampton, England, where she was formerly a pupil of Northampton High School. In November 2012 she was diagnosed with Perthes hip disease which requires her to undergo daily physiotherapy.

Swimming career
Robinson learned to swim at the age of four, and joined Northampton Swimming Club in 2012. She stopped training after 2 months (having been diagnosed with Perthes disease), but returned to the pool in 2014. In 2014 Robinson was enrolled into the British Swimming's World Class Podium Potential Programme.

She made her senior international debut for Great Britain at the 2015 International Deutsche Meisterschaften in Berlin. At the tournament she set a world record in the 100m butterfly, with a time of 1:26.30. She followed this with a silver in the 50m butterfly, in which she improved on her own British record, and a bronze in the 200m butterfly.

In 2016, in the build up to the Summer Paralympics in Rio, Robinson again improved upon her British 50m butterfly record, finishing in 36.34 and taking the gold medal. This was also under the time for consideration for Paralympic qualification. She followed this with her first major international tournament, representing Great Britain at the 2016 IPC Swimming European Championships in Funchal. There Robinson entered five events, winning medals in four of them. In the 200m Individual Medley (SM6) she finished fourth, but took bronze medals in the 50m, 100m and 400m freestyle events. In the 50m butterfly she was beaten into second place by the then Paralympic champion, Oksana Khrul of the Ukraine. Khrul, who set the then 50m world record of 36.05 at the 2012 Summer Paralympics in London, improved her time with a result of 35.48. Robinson's silver medal time was 35.66, also under the 2012 World record.

Robinson won the gold medal in the women's S6 50m butterfly event at the 2016 Paralympics in Rio de Janeiro, in a new Paralympics record time of 35.58 seconds, beating 2012 champion Oksana Khrul into second place. She also won a bronze in the 100m equivalent at the same Games.

Robinson won the gold medal in the women's S7 50m butterfly event at the 2018 Commonwealth Games, beating Canadian Sarah Mehainl into second place.

At the 2018 World Para Swimming European Championships in Dublin, Robinson won the women's S6 50m butterfly gold, ahead of Ireland's Nicole Turner and Ukraine's Oksana Khrul.

References

External links
 
 
 
 
 

2001 births
Living people
British female butterfly swimmers
English female freestyle swimmers
British female medley swimmers
Paralympic swimmers of Great Britain
Paralympic gold medalists for Great Britain
Paralympic bronze medalists for Great Britain
Paralympic medalists in swimming
Swimmers at the 2016 Summer Paralympics
Medalists at the 2016 Summer Paralympics
Medalists at the World Para Swimming European Championships
Commonwealth Games medallists in swimming
Commonwealth Games gold medallists for England
Swimmers at the 2018 Commonwealth Games
Members of the Order of the British Empire
Sportspeople from Northampton
Television presenters with disabilities
S6-classified Paralympic swimmers
21st-century English women
Medallists at the 2018 Commonwealth Games